The 2016 OFC Nations Cup was the tenth edition of the OFC Nations Cup, the quadrennial international men's football championship of Oceania organised by the Oceania Football Confederation (OFC). The tournament was played between 28 May and 11 June 2016 in Port Moresby, Papua New Guinea. The winner (New Zealand) qualified for the 2017 FIFA Confederations Cup in Russia.

Similar to the previous edition in 2012, the group stage of the tournament also doubled as the second round of the 2018 FIFA World Cup qualification tournament for the Oceania region. The top six teams of this tournament (i.e. the top three teams of each group in the group stage) advanced to the third round of World Cup qualifying, to be played between March and October 2017, with the winners of the third round proceeding to the inter-confederation play-offs in November 2017. This means that once again, the team that wins the qualifying competition and advances to the intercontinental play-off may be different from the team that wins the OFC Nations Cup and represents the OFC at the 2017 FIFA Confederations Cup.

The defending champions Tahiti, who had won their first title at the 2012 OFC Nations Cup, were eliminated in the Group stage.

Host selection
Tahiti, Fiji, Papua New Guinea and New Zealand were expected to bid to host the event. On 16 October 2015, OFC President David Chung confirmed that Papua New Guinea was the only member association to present a bid to host the 2016 OFC Nations Cup. The OFC confirmed Papua New Guinea as hosts on 30 October 2015.

Qualification

All 11 FIFA-affiliated national teams from OFC entered the OFC Nations Cup. The seven highest ranked teams (based on FIFA World Ranking and sporting reasons) among the 11 OFC entrants automatically qualified.

The 4 teams which competed in the qualification round of the 2012 tournament – American Samoa, Cook Islands, Samoa and Tonga – once again competed in a preliminary round. This was a round-robin tournament, held in one location (Tonga). The winners of the tournament, Samoa, qualified to compete alongside the remaining 7 Oceania nations.

Qualified teams

Format
The format of the OFC Nations Cup was as follows:
Group stage: The eight teams were divided into two groups of four teams. The top two teams of each group advanced to the knockout stage. Moreover, the top three teams of each group advanced to the third round of 2018 World Cup qualifying.
Knockout stage: The four teams played a single-elimination tournament (semi-finals and final) to decide the champions of the OFC Nations Cup.

The OFC had considered different proposals of the 2016 OFC Nations Cup. A previous proposal adopted by the OFC in October 2014 had the eight teams divided into two groups of four teams to play home-and-away round-robin matches in the second round, followed by the top two teams of each group advancing to the third round to play in a single group of home-and-away round-robin matches to decide the winner of the 2016 OFC Nations Cup which would both qualify to the 2017 FIFA Confederations Cup and advance to the inter-confederation play-offs. However, it was later reported in April 2015 that the OFC had reversed its decision, and the 2016 OFC Nations Cup will be played as a one-off tournament similar to the 2012 OFC Nations Cup.

Venues
The tournament was played at a single venue in Port Moresby.

Squads

Officials
10 referees and 12 assistant referees were named for the tournament.

Referees
 Ravitesh Behari
 Médéric Lacour
 Matthew Conger
 Nick Waldron
 Amos Anio
 George Time
 Norbert Hauata
 Abdelkader Zitouni
 Robinson Banga
 Joel Hopkken

Assistant Referees
 John Pareanga
 Ravinesh Kumar
 Avinesh Narayan
 Bertrand Brial
 Mark Rule
 Norman Bafinu Sali
 Noah Kusunan
 Johnny Erick Niabo
 Philippe Revel
 Folio Moeaki
 Tevita Makasini
 Hilmon Sese

Draw
The draw for the 2016 OFC Nations Cup was held as part of the 2018 FIFA World Cup Preliminary Draw on 25 July 2015, starting 18:00 MSK (UTC+3), at the Konstantinovsky Palace in Strelna, Saint Petersburg, Russia.

The seeding was based on the FIFA World Rankings of July 2015 (shown in parentheses). The eight teams were seeded into two pots:
Pot 1 contained the direct qualifiers ranked 1–4.
Pot 2 contained the direct qualifiers ranked 5–7 and the first round winner.

Each group contained two teams from Pot 1 and two teams from Pot 2. As the draw was held before the first round was played, the identity of the first round winner was not known at the time of the draw. The fixtures of each group were decided based on the draw position of each team (teams in Pot 1 drawn to position 1 or 2, teams in Pot 2 drawn to position 3 or 4).

Note: Bolded teams qualified for the World Cup qualifying third round.

Group stage

All times are local, UTC+10.

Group A

Group B

Knockout stage

If tied after regulation, extra time and, if necessary, penalty shoot-out would be used to decide the winner. All times are local, UTC+10.

Bracket

Semi-finals

Final

Goalscorers
There were 48 goals scored in 15 matches, for an average of  goals per match.

5 goals

 Raymond Gunemba

4 goals

 Chris Wood
 Teaonui Tehau

3 goals

 Roy Krishna
 Nigel Dabinyaba
 Michael Foster

2 goals

 Roy Kayara
 Rory Fallon
 Alvin Tehau

1 goal

 Samuela Kautoga
 Joerisse Cexome
 Brice Dahite
 Bertrand Kaï
 Kevin Nemia
 Jean-Philippe Saïko
 Jean-Brice Wadriako
 César Zeoula
 Luke Adams
 Kosta Barbarouses
 Michael McGlinchey
 Themistoklis Tzimopoulos
 Tommy Semmy
 Koriak Upaiga
 Jerry Donga
 Judd Molea
 Steevy Chong Hue
 Dominique Fred
 Brian Kaltak
 Fenedy Masauvakalo

Awards

Broadcasting rights

References

External links

Qualifiers – Oceania: Round 2, FIFA.com
OFC Nations Cup, oceaniafootball.com

 
2015–16 in OFC football
2016
2
2016 Ofc Nations Cup
2016 in Papua New Guinean sport
May 2016 sports events in Oceania
June 2016 sports events in Oceania